Kurash has been included in the Asian Games since the 2018 Asian Games in Indonesia.

Editions

Events

Medal table

Participating nations

List of medalists

References

External links 
Kurash Results Book

 
Sports at the Asian Games